Kasani Narayana (1 November 1928 – 8 February 2005) was a Member of Legislative Assembly in Andhra Pradesh, India. He fought against the Nizam authorities in Telangana and worked for social justice. He was on the monitoring panel for peace talks between the government of Andhra Pradesh and the Maoist Party in India.

During the peace talks between the government of Andhra Pradesh and the Maoist Party of India, Narayana was on the Peace monitoring panel.

External links
 Kasani Family website
 Kasani Narayana's interview by I Mallikarjuna Sharma
 

1928 births
2005 deaths
Indian National Congress politicians from Andhra Pradesh
Telugu politicians